Geithner is a surname. Notable people with the surname include:

 Aura Cristina Geithner (born 1967), Colombian actress
 Harry Geithner (born 1967), Colombian actor, film director, and producer
 Timothy Geithner (born 1961), American central banker and former Secretary of the Treasury

See also
 Coons v. Geithner

German-language surnames